William Holmes (February 23, 1904 – February 2, 1978) was an American film editor. He won an Oscar for Best Film Editing at the 14th Academy Awards for his work on the film Sergeant York.

He worked on 56 different films from 1925 to 1942.

Selected filmography

 Flying Luck (1927)
 Dugan of the Dugouts (1928)
 Romance of a Rogue (1928)
 Thundergod (1928)
 A Perfect Gentleman (1928)
 The Aviator (1929)
 Gold Diggers of Broadway (1929)
 Hardboiled Rose (1929)
 Million Dollar Collar (1929)
 Hold Everything (1930)
 The Life of the Party (1930)
 The Second Floor Mystery (1930)
 Three Faces East (1930)
 Illicit (1931)
 Manhattan Parade (1931)
 Svengali (1931)
 Alias the Doctor (1932)
 I Am a Fugitive from a Chain Gang (1932)
 Dark Victory (1939)
 Sergeant York (1941)
 They Died with Their Boots On (1941)

References

External links

Best Film Editing Academy Award winners
American film editors
1904 births
1978 deaths
People from Illinois